Paul Bergmann was an American football tight end.

Paul Bergmann may also refer to:
Paul Bergmann (politician), German Member of the IV. German Reichstag (Weimar Republic)
Paul Bergmann, former member of American band Thinking Fellers Union Local 282